Suraksan Station is a station on the Seoul Subway Line 7 in Nowon-gu, Seoul. Its name comes from the nearby Suraksan mountain.

Station layout

References 

Metro stations in Nowon District
Seoul Metropolitan Subway stations
Railway stations opened in 1996